Dorothy Frances Blomfield (1858–1932) was an English hymn-writer and poet.

Known as Dora, she was the  daughter of Frederick George Blomfield, Rector of St Andrew Undershaft in the City of London. She was a granddaughter of Charles James Blomfield, who was Bishop of London from 1828 to 1856; niece to the architect Sir Arthur Blomfield and Alfred Blomfield, Bishop of Colchester from 1882 to 1894; and cousin of the geologist Francis Arthur Bather.

"A shy, devout girl with an inner passion for nature and began writing short poems at an early age."

She married the actor Gerald Gurney in 1897; he was the son of Archer Thompson Gurney (1820–1887), a Church of England clergyman and hymnodist. In 1904 her husband was ordained a priest of the Church of England. In 1919 Dorothy and her husband joined the Roman Catholic Church.

Her Poems (London: Country Life, 1913) include "In God's Garden", "Moon Spell (or Dolly)" in 1882; "Shearing Day", "To the Immortals" and "Waggon Bells" in 1883; " Grandpapa's Wooing" in 1885; "Daffodil Time" in 1886; "Love's Service" in 1888; "When the gorse is all in blossom" in 1889; "Down here the lilacs fade" in 1893; and "North Country Songs" with Strang and Hadley in 1894.

With reference to the words of the hymn "O Perfect Love", written in 1883 for the wedding of her sister in the Lake District she quoted her sister as saying "What is the use of a sister who composes poetry if she cannot write new words to a favourite tune? I would like to use the tune at my wedding." Dora picked up a hymn book and said "If no-one will disturb me I will go in to the library and see what I can do".

References

1858 births
1932 deaths
19th-century British women writers
20th-century British women writers
Blomfield family
British women hymnwriters
Church of England hymnwriters
Converts to Roman Catholicism from Anglicanism
English women poets
English Roman Catholic hymnwriters
People from the City of London